Albert Mason may refer to:
 Albert L. Mason (1824–1896), member of the Wisconsin State Assembly
 Albert Abraham Mason (1926–2018), English anesthesiologist